Buckeye Local School District is a public school district based in Dillonvale, Ohio, United States. The school district includes all of  Mount Pleasant, Smithfield, Warren, and Wells townships in southern Jefferson County as well as very small portions of Cross Creek, Steubenville, and Wayne townships in central Jefferson County. A portion of Short Creek Township in southeastern Harrison County and Pease Township in northeastern Belmont County also lie within the district.

Nine incorporated villages are served by Buckeye Local Schools: Adena, Dillonvale, Harrisville, Mount Pleasant, New Alexandria, Rayland, Smithfield, Tiltonsville, and Yorkville. Notable unincorporated communities in the district include Brilliant, Connorville, Greentown, Hopewell, Piney Fork, and Weems.

New middle school
As of the 2010-2011 School year the two Buckeye Local Jr. High Schools, North Middle School and South-West Middle School, have combined to make a new Jr. High. This Jr. High (grades 7-8) takes up the 1st floor of the high school building, while grades 9-12 occupy the upper floor.

Schools

High school
Grades 9-12
Buckeye Local High School

Middle school
Grades 7-8
Buckeye Local Junior High

Elementary schools
Preschool-Grade 6
North Elementary School
South Elementary School
West Elementary School

Former schools
Warren Consolidated High School in Tiltonsville

See also
List of school districts in Ohio

References

External links
Buckeye Local School District – Official School Website
Buckeye Local School District - Official School Website (If the 1st link doesn't work.)

School districts in Ohio
Education in Jefferson County, Ohio
Education in Harrison County, Ohio
Education in Belmont County, Ohio